Complex metallic alloys (CMAs) or complex intermetallics (CIMs) are intermetallic compounds characterized by the following structural features:

large unit cells, comprising some tens up to thousands of atoms,
the presence of well-defined atom clusters, frequently of icosahedral  point group symmetry,
the occurrence of inherent disorder in the ideal structure.

Overview
Complex metallic alloys  is an umbrella term for intermetallic compounds with a relatively large unit cell. There is no precise definition of how large the unit cell of a complex metallic alloy has to be, but the broadest definition includes Zintl phases, skutterudites, and Heusler compounds on the most simple end, and quasicrystals on the more complex end.

Research
Following the invention of X-ray crystallography techniques in the 1910s, the atomic structure of many compounds was investigated. Most metals have relatively simple structures. However, in 1923 Linus Pauling reported on the structure of the intermetallic NaCd2, which had such a complicated structure he was  unable to fully explain it. Thirty years later, he concluded that NaCd2 contains 384 sodium and 768 cadmium atoms in each unit cell.

Most physical properties of CMAs show distinct differences with respect to the behavior of normal metallic alloys and therefore these materials possess a high potential for technological application.

The European Commission funded the Network of Excellence CMA  from 2005 to 2010, uniting 19 core groups in 12 countries. From this emerged the European Integrated Center for the Development of New Metallic Alloys and Compounds C-MAC , which connects researchers at 21 universities.

Examples
Example phases are:

β-Mg2Al3: 1168 atoms per unit cell, face-centred cubic, atoms arranged in Friauf polyhedra.
ξ'–Al74Pd22Mn4: 318 atoms per unit cell, face-centred orthorhombic, atoms arranged in Mackay-type clusters.
  (Bergman phase): 163 atoms per unit cell, body centred cubic, atoms arranged in Bergman clusters.
  (Taylor phase): 204 atoms per unit cell, face-centred orthorhombic, atoms arranged in Mackay-type clusters.

See also
 High-entropy alloys, alloys of multiple elements which ideally form no intermetallics
 Holmium–magnesium–zinc quasicrystal
 Frank–Kasper phases
 Laves phase
 Hume-Rothery rules

References

Further reading

Intermetallics
Crystal structure types